Dave Chivers (born 25 January 1936) is  a former Australian rules footballer who played with Fitzroy in the Victorian Football League (VFL).

Notes

External links 
		

1936 births
Living people
Australian rules footballers from Victoria (Australia)
Fitzroy Football Club players